Lapinje (or Laubbüchel) is a former village in the Municipality of Kočevje in southern Slovenia. The area is part of the traditional region of Lower Carniola and is now included in the Southeast Slovenia Statistical Region. Its territory is now part of the village of Podlesje.

History
Lapinje was a Gottschee German village. In feudal times it was part of the Dominion of Poljane. In 1576 it consisted of one full farm and one half-farm. In 1931 there were five houses in the village. The Cankar Brigade of the Partisan forces was founded in Lapinje in 1942; a plaque has been installed at the site to commemorate the event. Together with Verdreng, Zgornji Pokštajn, and Spodnji Pokštajn, it was merged into the settlement of Podlesje in 1955.

References

External links
Lapinje on Geopedia
Pre–World War II map of Lapinje with oeconyms and family names

Former populated places in the Municipality of Kočevje
Populated places disestablished in 1955

1955 disestablishments in Slovenia